The white-rumped snowfinch (Onychostruthus taczanowskii) is a species of passerine bird in the sparrow family Passeridae. It is the only member of the genus Onychostruthus. It is sometimes placed in the genus Montifringilla.

It is found in Tibet and central-northern China. Its natural habitats are rocky areas in mountainous regions.

References

External links
Images and classification at Animal Diversity Web

Birds of Tibet
Birds of Central China
white-rumped snowfinch
Taxonomy articles created by Polbot